The 1937 NCAA Track and Field Championships was the 16th NCAA track and field championship.  The event was held at Berkeley, California in June 1937.  The University of Southern California won its second consecutive team championship.

Team scoring
1. University of Southern California - 62 points
2. Stanford - 50 points
3. Ohio State - 28
4. Washington State - 24
5. Indiana - 22
6. Columbia - 21
7. Pittsburg State - 17
8. Michigan - 16
9. Notre Dame - 15
10. Wisconsin - 12

Track events
100-yard dash  
1. Sam Stoller, Michigan - 9.7 seconds
2. Ben Johnson, Columbia
3. Donald Dunn, Kansas Teachers (Pittsburg)
4. George Boone, USC
5. Bob Grieve, Illinois

120-yard high hurdles
1. Forrest Towns, Georgia - 14.3 seconds
2. Allen Tolmich, Wayne University
3. Roy Staley, USC
4. Verne Sumner, Kansas Teachers (Emporia)
5. Bob Osgood, Michigan

220-yard dash 
1. Ben Johnson, Columbia - 21.3 seconds
2. Jack Weiershauser, Stanford
3. Lee Orr, Washington State
4. Curt Ledford, Washington State
5. Fred Elliott, Indiana

220-yard low hurdles 
1. Earl Vickery, USC - 23.3 seconds
2. Jack Weiershauser, Stanford
3. Verne Sumner, Kansas Teachers (Emporia)
4. Robert Lemen, Purdue
5. Tom Berkeley, UCLA

440-yard dash 
1. Lorin Benke, Washington State - 47.1 seconds
2. Ray Malott, Stanford
3. Harley Howells, Ohio State
4. Charles Belcher, Georgia Tech
5. Richard Gill, Boston College

880-yard run 
1. John Woodruff, Pitt - 1:50.3 (NCAA record)
2. Ross Bush, USC
3. Chuck Beetham, USC
4. Vic Palmason, Washington
5. Dick Squire, Ohio State

One-mile run 
1. Charles Fenske, Wisconsin - 4:13.9
2. Jim Smith, Indiana
3. Mel Trutt, Indiana
4. Gregory Rice, Notre Dame
5. Dave Rogan, Kentucky

Two-mile run 
1. Gregory Rice, Notre Dame - 9:14.2 (NCAA record)
2. Bill Feiler, Drake
3. Richard Frey, Michigan State
4. Thomas Deckard, Indiana
5. Fred Padget, Drake

Field events

Broad jump 
1. Kermit King, Kansas Teachers (Pittsburg) - 25 feet, 3-1/4 inches
2. Arnold Nutting, California
3. Eulace Peacock, Temple
4. Bob Hubbard, Minnesota
5. George Boone, USC

High jump 
1. Dave Albritton, Ohio State - 6 feet, 6-1/4 inches
2. Gilbert Cruter, Colorado - 6 feet, 6-1/4 inches
3. Delos Thurber, USC - 6 feet, 6-1/4 inches
4. Mel Walker, Ohio State
5. Jack Vickery, Texas
5. Ed Burke, Marquette

Pole vault 
1. Bill Sefton, USC - 14 feet, 8-7/8 inches
2. George Varoff, Oregon
3. Earle Meadows, USC
4. Irving Howe, USC
5. Albert Haller, Wisconsin

Discus throw 
1. Pete Zagar, Stanford - 156 feet, 3 inches
2. Hugh Gribbin, Stanford
3. Charles Socolofsky, Kansas State
4. Phil Gaspar, USC
5. Donald Johnson, Idaho

Javelin 
1. Lowell Todd, San Jose State - 214 feet, 9-3/8 inches
2. Bill Reitz, UCLA
3. Don Johnson, Idaho
4. John Guckeyson, Maryland
5. Chuck Soper, USC

Shot put 
1. Sam Francis, Nebraska - 53.50
2. Dimitri Zaitz, Boston College - 52.17
3. Jim Reynolds, Stanford - 51.76
4. William Watson, Michigan - 51.15
5. Dan Taylor, Columbia

See also
 NCAA Men's Outdoor Track and Field Championship

References

NCAA Men's Outdoor Track and Field Championship